Ivaylo Ivanov (born 8 December 1974) is a former Bulgarian football goalkeeper, who works as goalkeeper coach for youth team CSKA Sofia.

Career
Ivaylo Ivanov is a product of CSKA Sofia's youth system. He made his debut in the first game of the 1998–99 season on 22 July 1998 in a 0–0 away draw against Belshina Bobruisk of the UEFA Cup, and did not lose his starting place to the end of the season. Ivanov earned 24 appearances in the A PFG, seven in the Bulgarian Cup, eight in the UEFA Cup and won the 1999 Bulgarian Cup.

In the next 1999–2000 season he became CSKA's second-choice goalkeeper, behind Todor Kyuchukov. During the season, he made just eight appearances for the club.

CSKA signed Nenad Lukić and Stoyan Kolev at the start of the 2001–02 season, and Lukić became the first choice goalkeeper. Second choice was Kolev with Ivanov slipping down to third.

In March 2013, he signed a contract with Slavia Sofia, but did no make any league appearances for the team.

Club statistics
As of 15 December 2010

References

1974 births
Living people
Bulgarian footballers
First Professional Football League (Bulgaria) players
PFC CSKA Sofia players
Ilisiakos F.C. players
PFC Minyor Pernik players
PFC Beroe Stara Zagora players
PFC Slavia Sofia players

Association football goalkeepers